Chik is an urban-type settlement in Kochenyovsky District, Novosibirsk Oblast, Russia. Population:

References

Notes

Sources

Urban-type settlements in Novosibirsk Oblast